Sunday A. Adebayo (born 12 September 1973) is a Nigerian former professional basketball player. He played college basketball for the Arkansas Razorbacks and Memphis Tigers.

Early life
Adebayo was born in Benin City, Nigeria. As a high school student, he played for the Nigerian soccer team at the Junior World Cup. He was a goalkeeper, and aspired to play professional soccer in Europe until his conversion to playing basketball as he grew taller. Adebayo played for the Nigerian basketball team at the 1991 FIBA Under-19 World Championship.

Adebayo moved to the United States to work for an uncle who owned a computer company in New Jersey. He played basketball in a league at his church and in the playgrounds of Newark while he worked for a year.

College career
In 1993, Adebayo travelled to Arkansas to try earn a scholarship to play for the Central Arkansas Bears but the team had its roster set and did not want to acquire someone who they considered a long-term project. Central Arkansas head coach Don Dyer later lamented the loss and compared Adebayo to former Bears player Scottie Pippen. Adebayo instead began his college basketball career playing for the Raiders of Three Rivers College, where he became a first-team All-American. He averaged 19 points and 10 rebounds during his junior college career. Adebayo still holds the Raiders record for career rebounds with 706.

Adebayo earned attention from major NCAA Division I teams throughout his junior college career, and Adebayo committed to play for the Arkansas Razorbacks on 18 April 1995. He averaged 10.7 points and a team-high 7.6 rebounds during the 1995–96 season. On 1 March 1996, Adebayo was deemed ineligible by the Razorbacks to complete the final 11 games of the season due to issues with his junior college transcript. The National Collegiate Athletic Association (NCAA) had commenced questioning about Adebayo's eligibility and the Razorbacks voluntarily declared Adebayo ineligible. His junior college grades had not been properly certified due to an administrative error by the University of Arkansas, and he had started to practice with the Razorbacks eight days earlier than permitted. Adebayo was allowed to stay at the University of Arkansas but could not play on the basketball team or receive financial aid. The NCAA declared that Adebayo would have immediate eligibility if he transferred to a school outside of the Razorbacks' Southeastern Conference (SEC) and cited "extenuating circumstances." Adebayo entered his name into the 1996 NBA draft but stated that he would consider transferring to play for the Oral Roberts Golden Eagles, Oklahoma State Cowboys or Memphis Tigers if he did not like his draft prospects. He withdrew from the draft before it took place and transferred to play for Memphis.

Adebayo's start with the Tigers during the 1996–97 season was delayed while he completed exams. When the Tigers played an away game against the Razorbacks on February 2, 1997, Adebayo received two standing ovations from Razorbacks fans at the suggestion of Razorbacks coach Nolan Richardson. Adebayo stayed in contact with his former team throughout the season in a display of loyalty that Richardson considered "unique." Adebayo's devotion to the Razorbacks bothered Tigers fans, who considered him a "traitor" and booed him throughout his first game upon his return from Arkansas. He averaged 13.3 points and a team-high 7 rebounds per game during his only season with the Tigers.

In April 1997, the NCAA admitted that Adebayo had been wrongly suspended. Adebayo hired a lawyer and appealed to earn a rare fifth season of college eligibility that was granted by an NCAA administrative review panel in October 1997. He returned to the Arkansas Razorbacks for the 1997–98 season but was required to relinquish his scholarship to comply with NCAA sanctions placed on the team for other violations. Adebayo stated: "I knew I didn't do anything wrong. People say I've made history, but I don't get carried away with that. I'm just glad I got the year here back." His entry back into the Razorbacks lineup was hindered due to a sprained ankle. Adebayo averaged 6.2 points and 3.0 rebounds per game during the 1997–98 season.

Professional career
Adebayo was selected by the Grand Rapids Hoops with the 55th overall pick in the 1998 Continental Basketball Association (CBA) draft.

Adebayo played four games in the German Basketball Bundesliga (BBL) during the 2000–01 season. He averaged 15.7 points and 8.0 rebounds per game.

Adebayo played for the Perth Wildcats of the Australian National Basketball League (NBL) during the 2002–03 NBL season. He averaged 5.0 points and 4.4 rebounds per game.

Career statistics

College

|-
| style="text-align:left;"| 1995–96
| style="text-align:left;"| Arkansas
| 22 || 14 || 26.1 || .572 || – || .609 || 7.6 || 1.4 || 1.4 || .4 || 10.5
|-
| style="text-align:left;"| 1996–97
| style="text-align:left;"| Memphis
| 26 || 23 || 31.6 || .579 || .000 || .619 || 7.0 || 1.5 || .8 || .4 || 13.3
|-
| style="text-align:left;"| 1997–98
| style="text-align:left;"| Arkansas
| 22 || 6 || 15.2 || .511 || – || .677 || 3.6 || 1.3 || .8 || .2 || 6.2
|- class="sortbottom"
| style="text-align:center;" colspan="2"| Career
| 70 || 43 || 24.7 || .564 || .000 || .630 || 6.1 || 1.4 || 1.0 || .3 || 10.2

References

External links
College statistics

1973 births
Living people
Arkansas Razorbacks men's basketball players
Brose Bamberg players
Memphis Tigers men's basketball players
Nigerian expatriate basketball people in Australia
Nigerian expatriate basketball people in Germany
Nigerian expatriate basketball people in the United States
Nigerian men's basketball players
Perth Wildcats players
Power forwards (basketball)
Sportspeople from Benin City